Emmerke is a  part of the municipality of Giesen in the district of Hildesheim, Lower Saxony, in north-western Germany.

Geography

Emmerke is approx.6 km of the district town Hildesheim and 25 km from the state capital Hanover

Description
Emmerke has 1,752 inhabitants as of May 2004. History documents that  the village of Emmerke is the oldest settlement in the area. It was named in 854 in a goods inventory of the monastery of Corvey under the place name of Anmarki in Scotelingen.

Also the Hildesheimer church was built in Emmerke. Some  early documents  were lost and brought back by Bishop Hezilo of Hildesheim (1054–1179).  The foundation charter of the Godehardiklosters of 1146 states the name comes from Embrike and was modified in 1250 and 1251 to read 'Embreke'.
Embrike belonged to Kleinen pin Hildesheim and thus to the few predominantly catholic municipalities in the eastern Lower Saxony.

External links
Emmerke Website

Towns in Lower Saxony